Tomb TT195, located in the necropolis of El-Assasif in Thebes, Egypt, is the tomb of Bekenamun, who was a scribe in the treasury of the Estate of Amun during the Nineteenth Dynasty of Egypt. Bekenamun's tomb is part of the TT192 tomb complex.

Bekenamun had a wife named Weretnefert.

See also
 List of Theban tombs

References

Theban tombs